The 2019 wildfire season involves wildfires on multiple continents.

List of wildfires
Events during the season include the following:

Africa
2019 Canary Islands wildfires, Spain

Asia
2019 Bandipur forest fires, India
Goseong Fire of 2019, South Korea
2019 Siberia wildfires, Russia
2019 Vietnam forest fires

A series of wildfires contributed to the Southeast Asian haze in 2019.

Europe
2019 United Kingdom wildfires

North America
Deshka Landing Fire, Alaska, United States
2019 Alberta wildfires, Canada
2019 California wildfires, United States 
2019 Washington wildfires, United States 
July-August wildfire between Sisimiut and Kangerlussuaq at Kangerluarsuk Tulleq, Greenland

Oceania
2018–19 Australian bushfire season
2019 Nelson fires, New Zealand
2019–20 Australian bushfire season

South America
2019 Amazon wildfires

References

 
2019